Brasfield (or Brassfield) is an English-language surname. People with this surname include:

Brasfield
Furonda Brasfield, America's Next Top Model contestant
Guy Brasfield Park (1872–1946), Missouri politician
James Brasfield, translator of Oleh Lysheha's work
Rod Brasfield (1910–1958), American comedian
Brasfield & Gorrie, a large U.S. construction company
Billy Brasfield, also known as Billy B., makeup artist to celebrities (most notably Lady Gaga)

Brassfield
Darin Brassfield (1960 - ), American racing driver
Hersal Brassfield, jazz musician

Other uses
Brassfield Hydroelectricity Site
Brassfield Formation

English-language surnames